The Cardinal of Venice may refer to:

 Francesco Condulmer (1390–1453), Catholic cardinal and nephew of Pope Eugene IV
 Pietro Foscari (died 1485), Catholic cardinal
 Maffeo Gherardi (1406–1492), Patriarch of Venice and Catholic cardinal

See also
 Patriarch of Venice